Biting is a common zoological behavior involving the active, rapid closing of the jaw around an object. This behavior is found in toothed animals such as mammals, reptiles, amphibians and fish, but can also exist in arthropods. Myocytic contraction of the muscles of mastication is responsible for generating the force that initiates the preparatory jaw abduction (opening), then rapidly adducts (closes) the jaw and moves the top and bottom teeth towards each other, resulting in the forceful action of a bite.

Biting is one of the main functions in most macro-organisms' life, providing them the ability to forage, hunt, eat, build, play, fight and protect, and much more. Biting may be a form of physical aggression due to predatory or territorial intentions, but can also be a normal activity of an animal as it eats, carries objects, softens and prepares food for its young, removes ectoparasites or irritating foreign objects (e.g. burred plant seeds) from body surface, scratches itself, and grooms other animals.

Animal bites often result in serious punctures, avulsions, fractures, hemorrhages, infections, envenomation and death.  In modern human societies, dog bites are the most common types, with children the most common victims and faces the most common targets.  Other species that can exhibit such behavior towards human are typically aggressive urban animals such as feral cats, spiders and snakes, micropredators such as vampire bats and hematophagic arachnids (e.g. mosquitoes, fleas, lice, bedbugs and ticks, whose "bites" are actually a form of sting-like puncture rather than true biting), or dangerous wild carnivores such as wolves, big cats, bears, crocodilians and predatory fishes (e.g. sharks, barracudas and piranhas).

Types of teeth

The types of teeth that organisms use to bite varies throughout the animal kingdom. Different types of teeth are seen in herbivores, carnivores, and omnivores as they are adapted over many years to better fit their diets. Carnivores possess canine, carnassial, and molar teeth, while herbivores are equipped with incisor teeth and wide-back molars. In general, tooth shape has traditionally been used to predict dieting habits. Carnivores have long, extremely sharp teeth for both gripping prey and cutting meat into chunks. They lack flat chewing teeth because they swallow food in chunks. An example of this is shown by the broad, serrated teeth of great white sharks which prey on large marine animals. On the other hand, herbivores have rows of wide, flat teeth to bite and chew grass and other plants. Cows spend up to eleven hours a day biting off grass and grinding it with their molars. Omnivores consume both meat and plants, so they possess a mixture of flat teeth and sharp teeth.

Carrying mechanism
Biting can serve as a carrying mechanism for species such as beavers and ants, the raw power of their species-specific teeth allowing them to carry large objects. In beavers specifically, they have a large tooth adapted for gnawing wood. Their jaw muscles are tuned to power through big trees and carry them back to their dam. In ant behavior, ants use their powerful jaws to lift material back to the colony. They can carry several thousand times their weight due to their bite and adapted to use this to forage for their colonies. Fire ants use their strong bite to get a grip on prey, then inject a toxin via their abdomen and carry the prey back to their territory.

Dangers
Some organisms have dangerous bites that inject venom. Many snakes and lizards carry a venomous saliva containing at least one of the major groups of toxins, which include cytotoxins, hemotoxins, myotoxins, and neurotoxins. Spider venom polypeptides target specific ion channels, which excites components of the peripheral, central and autonomic nervous systems, causing hyperactive neurotransmitter release and subsequently refractory paralysis. Spider bites, or arachnidism, are mainly a form of predation, but also means of self-defense — when trapped or accidentally tampered with by humans, spiders retaliate by biting. The recluse spider and widow species have neurotoxins and necrotizing agents that paralyze and digest prey.

There are several creatures with non-lethal bites that may cause discomfort or diseases. Mosquito bites may cause allergic wheals that are itchy and may last a few days; in some areas, they can spread blood-borne diseases (e.g. malaria and West Nile fever) via transmission of protozoic or viral pathogens. Similarly, tick bites spread diseases endemic to their location, most famously Lyme disease, but ticks also serve as disease vectors for Colorado tick fever, African tick bite fever, Tick-borne encephalitis, etc.

In humans 
Biting is also an age appropriate behavior and reaction for human children 30 months and younger. Conversely, children above this age are expected to have verbal skills to explain their needs and dislikes, as biting is not seen as age appropriate. Biting may be prevented by methods including redirection, change in the environment and responding to biting by talking about appropriate ways to express anger and frustration. School-age children, those older than 30 months, who habitually bite may require professional intervention.  Some discussion of human biting appears in The Kinsey Report on Sexual Behavior in the Human Female. Biting may also occur in physical fights or in self-defense. 

Criminally, Forensic Dentistry is involved in bite-mark analysis. Because bite-marks change significantly over time, investigators must call for an expert as soon as possible. Bites are then analyzed to determine whether the biter was human, self-inflicted or not, and whether DNA was left behind from the biter. All measurements must be extremely precise, as small errors in measurement can lead to large errors in legal judgment.

See also 
 Chewing
 Bite force quotient
 Animal bite

References

External links
 

Ethology